Shin Asuka  may refer to:

 Shin Asuka, a character in Ultraman Dyna
 Shinn Asuka, a character in  Mobile Suit Gundam SEED Destiny